Chuquiananta (possibly from Aymara chuqi gold, Quechua chuqi metal, gold (<Aymara), every kind of precious metal) is a mountain in the Andes of southern  Peru, about  high. It is situated in the Moquegua Region, Mariscal Nieto Province, Torata District, and in the Tacna Region, Candarave Province, Camilaca District. Chuquiananta lies south-west of Tutupaca volcano, south-east of Pomani.

References

Mountains of Peru
Mountains of Moquegua Region
Mountains of Tacna Region